Scopula origalis  (or Scopula danieli) is a moth of the family Geometridae. It is found in Iran (Laristan).

Adults have been recorded on wing in mid of November.

Subspecies
Scopula origalis origalis
Scopula origalis danieli (Wiltshire, 1966)
Scopula origalis safida (Wiltshire, 1966)
Scopula origalis vantshica (Viidalepp, 1988)

References

Moths described in 1941
Moths of the Middle East
origalis